Marie-Françoise Constance Mayer La Martinière (9 March 1775 – 26 May 1821) was a French painter of portraits, allegorical subjects, miniatures and genre works. She had "a brilliant but bitter career."

Biography

Constance Mayer was born in Chaumont, a town in northeastern France. Her father, Nicolas Mayer, was a wealthy banker and her mother, Marie-Angelique Mayer, was a homemaker. Mayer was the second of three children and was raised in a privileged household.

Mayer showed an early interest in the arts and was encouraged in her pursuits by her family. Her father was an amateur painter and her older brother, Louis-François, was a professional artist who had studied under Jacques-Louis David.

Despite her family's support, Mayer's artistic education was limited in her early years. As a girl, she was not permitted to attend the École des Beaux-Arts, the prestigious art school in Paris, because it did not accept female students. Instead, she received instruction in drawing and painting from her brother and other private tutors.

Despite these limitations, Mayer continued to develop her artistic skills and her unique style began to emerge. Her early works, which were largely portraits of family members and friends, were marked by their delicate lines and attention to detail.

Mayer painted genre scenes and portraits in her early 20s. Having studied with Joseph-Benoît Suvée and Jean-Baptiste Greuze, she adopted a style of soft brush strokes and made paintings of sentimental scenes like that of her instructors. Greuze, for instance, his daughters said that "he painted virtue, friendship and innocence, and his soul breathes through his pictures" although more objective opinions were that he painted wounded and vulnerable subjects.

Following the French Revolution's Reign of Terror, society settled into a calmer lifestyle in which miniature and portrait paintings became popular. Mayer painted portraits of women and children, family scenes, self-portraits and miniatures of her father. She attained a degree of success, exhibited Self-Portrait of Citizenness Mayer Pointing to a Sketch for a Portrait of Her Mother, and exhibited at every salon thereafter. At the 1801 salon, she exhibited Self-Portrait with Artist's Father: He Points to a Bust of Raphael, Inviting Her to Take This Celebrated Painter as a Model. Sensitive to the viewpoint of women artists, Mayer had her work presented as the student of Greuze and Suvee so that they would be more acceptable to the public. She worked in Jacques-Louis David's studio in 1801 and adopted a direct and simple style under his tutelage, but still depicted sentimental scenes.

Mayer had a close relationship with Joseph Ducreux (1735-1802), a fellow artist and art dealer. Mayer and Ducreux first met in Paris in the late 1790s, when Mayer was studying u Jacques-Louis David. The two artists quickly formed a close bond and began collaborating on a number of artistic projects.

In 1802, Mayer and Ducreux were married, and they went on to have two children together. The couple continued to collaborate on artistic projects throughout their marriage, and they ran a successful art dealership in Paris that sold works by some of the most famous artists of the day.

Mayer's relationship with Ducreux was a significant influence on her artistic style. While she was known for her delicate and intimate portraits of women, Ducreux's influence can be seen in Mayer's use of rich colors and attention to detail. Additionally, Mayer's interest in the domestic sphere was likely shaped by her experiences as a mother and wife.

She studied with Pierre-Paul Prud'hon beginning in 1802, but they did not have the typical pupil-master relationship. In many ways, there were more like peers. They had both exhibited at the salon and unlike Prud'hon, she had received a better education in art, and he was known for his talent in drawing, particularly complex historic compositions.

During the time when Prud'hon was painting the portrait of Empress Josephine, his wife, in a fit of jealousy, claimed that he was having an affair with the empress. Prud'hon's wife was held in an asylum and Prud'hon was given custody of their children.

After the artist Prud'hon had separated from his wife, the Emperor Napoleon gave him an apartment in the Sorbonne. At about the same time (c. 1803), Napoléon, who had purchased two of her paintings, gave Mayer an apartment there too. There she served as Prud'hon's assistant, raised his five children and was known as his "favorite pupil."

After 1804 her works of art were greatly influenced by Prud'hon and subsequently received greater acclaim for her paintings. This situation lasted until 1821 or 1822 when "she heard it announced that the artist (Prud'hon) must leave the Sorbonne to the claims of the church.".

Prud'hon's wife died and Mayer had expected that she would marry him. Prone to depression throughout her life, this prompted a crisis in Mayer's life, "when Prud'hon refused to acknowledge her assistance and marry her after the many years she had served as his assistant and his housekeeper", she then seized "the artist's razor, drew it across her throat."

Prud'hon organized a retrospective of her works the following year but, distressed by her death, died in 1823.

They are buried together in Paris's Père Lachaise cemetery.

Controversy

As was often the case with women artists who were associated with better known male artists, there were claims made that she did not produce all the work attributed to her and because of her long relationship with Prud'hon, it is still not well understood exactly what he did and what she did. This confusion is in large part due to the fact that the two artists collaborated on several works: he sketched the design and she made the paintings. Many were exhibited under her name, but when the works became part of public collections they were attributed to Prud'hon. For instance, Venus and Cupid sleeping now attributed to Mayer was initially attributed in the Wallace Collection to Prud'hon.

Legacy
Like Pauline Auzou, Marguerite Gérard,  Antoinette Haudebourt-Lescot and Marie-Denise Villers, Mayer was one of the successful women artists following the French Revolution:

Her work was exhibited by the National Museum of Women of the Arts in "An Imperial Collection: Women Artists from the State Hermitage Museum."

Gallery

Notes

References

External links

1775 births
1821 deaths
19th-century French painters
Burials at Père Lachaise Cemetery
Suicides by sharp instrument in France
19th-century French women artists
1820s suicides